Getting Out is a play by Marsha Norman. The play was produced at the Marymount Manhattan Theatre in October 1978 and then Off-Broadway in May 1979. The play concerns a female prisoner just released from prison, who returns to her home in Kentucky. Although she tries to have a normal life, her past experiences keep intruding.

Production history
Getting Out, a play by Marsha Norman, was presented by the Phoenix Theatre at the Marymount Manhattan Theatre from October 19, 1978 to November 5, 1978. It was then produced by Lester Osterman, Lucille Lortel, and Marc Howard at the Off-Broadway Theatre de Lys, opening on May 15, 1979 and running to December 9, 1979. The cast:

Arlene - Susan Kingsley
Arlie - Pamela Reed
Guard Evans - John C. Capodice
Bennie - Bob Burrus
Guard Caldwell - Fritz Sperberg
Doctor - William Jay
Mother - Madeleine Thornton-Sherwood
School Principal - Anna Minot
Ronnie - Kevin Bacon
Carl - Leo Burmester
Warden - Hansford Rowe
Ruby - Joan Pape

The creatives:

Directed by: Jon Jory
Associated producers: Spencer H. Berlin and Marilyn R. Strauss
Scenery/Lighting: James Tilton
Costumes: Kurt Wilhelm

Other Productions

The world premiere was held at the Humana Festival at the Actors Theatre of Louisville, Kentucky on November 2, 1977. The West Coast premiere was produced by the Center Theatre Group of Los Angeles at the Mark Taper Forum.

Setting and original performance conditions
"Both acts are set in a dingy one-room apartment in a rundown section of downtown Louisville, Kentucky. There is a sink, an apartment-size combination stove and refrigerator, and a counter with cabinets above. Dirty curtains conceal the bars on the outside of the single window. There is one closet and a door to the bathroom. The door to the apartment opens into a hall."

"A catwalk stretches above the apartment and a prison cell, Stage Right, connects it by the stairways. An apron Downstage and Stage Left completes the enclosure of the apartment in playing areas for the past. The apartment must seem imprisoned." (Dramatists Plays Service Inc.)

Synopsis
"Released from prison Arlene returns to a run-down apartment in Louisville, intent on starting her life over. Rebellious and disruptive as a young girl, she has found strength in religion and wants to put her youth (as Arlie) behind her. But her struggles to find her way in the present (as Arlene) is counterpointed by flashbacks of her past (as Arlie), her two personalities being represented by two performers, who sometimes appear onstage simultaneously. We meet the guards and prison officials with whom Arlie waged a running battle; and the unfeeling, slatternly mother, the lecherous former prison guard, the pimp ex-boyfriend, and the touchingly friendly neighbor with whom Arlene is confronted in the present. Ultimately, the play, like life, offers no simple answers---but it conveys, with heart-rending honesty and compassion, the struggle of someone fighting for her life against incredible odds" (Dramatists Play Service Inc.)

Character summaries
Arlene: a thin, drawn woman in her late twenties, who has just served an 8-year prison term for murder
Arlie: Arlene at various times in her life
Bennie: an Alabama prison guard in his 50s
Evans: a prison guard
Doctor: a psychiatrist in a juvenile institution
Caldwell: another prison guard
Mother: Arlene's mother
School Principal
Ronnie: a teenager in a juvenile institution
Carl: Arlene's former pimp and partner in various crimes; in his late 20s
Warden: Superintendent of Pine Ridge Correctional Institute for Women
Ruby: Arlene's upstairs neighbor; a cook in a local diner; also an ex-con, in her late 30s

Text
Getting Out, A Play in Two Acts (Dramatists Play Service)

Awards and recognition
Marsha Norman won the 1979 Outer Critics Circle John Glassner Award, and Susan Kingsley won the Outer Critics Circle Award for Best New Talent.

The play was a 1979 Selection, The Burns Mantle Theater Yearbook, The Best Plays of 1978-1979

References

1979 plays
Plays by Marsha Norman
Plays set in Kentucky